Lewis C. Cassidy Academics Plus School is a historic elementary school located in the Overbrook neighborhood of Philadelphia, Pennsylvania. It is part of the School District of Philadelphia. The building was designed by Irwin T. Catharine and built in 1922–1924. It is a three-story, nine bay by five bay, brick building on a raised basement in the Colonial Revival-style. It features large stone arch surrounds on the first level, a projecting entrance pavilion, a double stone cornice, and brick parapet topped by stone coping.

The building was added to the National Register of Historic Places in 1988. Demolition of the building began in September 2021. The new school construction will be complete in June 2023.

References

External links

School buildings on the National Register of Historic Places in Philadelphia
Colonial Revival architecture in Pennsylvania
School buildings completed in 1924
School District of Philadelphia
Overbrook, Philadelphia
Public elementary schools in Philadelphia
1924 establishments in Pennsylvania